Pánfilo de Narváez (147?–1528) was a Spanish conquistador and soldier in the Americas. Born in Spain, he first embarked to Jamaica in 1510 as a soldier. He came to participate in the conquest of Cuba and led an expedition to Camagüey escorting Bartolomé de las Casas. 
 
He is most remembered as the leader of two failed expeditions: In 1520 he was sent to Mexico by the Governor of Cuba Diego Velázquez de Cuéllar, with the objective of stopping the invasion by Hernán Cortés which had not been authorized by the Governor. Even though his 900 men outmanned those of Cortés 3 to 1, Narváez was outmaneuvered, lost an eye and was taken prisoner in the Battle of Cempoala. After a couple of years in captivity in Mexico he returned to Spain where King Carlos V named him adelantado, with the mission of exploring and colonizing La Florida. In 1527 Narváez embarked from Spain with five ships and 600 men, among them Álvar Núñez Cabeza de Vaca who later described the expedition in his publication, the Relación in 1542 and again in 1555. A storm south of Cuba wrecked several of the ships.  The rest of the expedition left Cuba in February, 1528 with the intended destination of the Rio de las Palmas, near present-day Tampico, Mexico. The ships first ran aground and then while trying to reach Havana to re-supply were driven north to the west coast of Florida, landing in Boca Ciega Bay, north of the main entrance to Tampa Bay. Finding their landing place unsuitable for settlement, Narváez ordered that the expedition be split, with 100 men and 10 women aboard ships, and 300 men and 42 horses traveling by land. Their plan was to travel a short distance north and rejoin at a large harbor that his pilots had said would be "impossible to miss". There was no large harbor to the north, and the land expedition and those aboard the ships did not meet again. The land-based expedition worked their way northward along the U.S. Gulf Coast trying to get to the province of Pánuco on the gulf coast of Mexico. They reached present-day St. Marks River, approximately 300 miles north of their original landing site. Narváez ordered that boats be built, and the 250 survivors set sail westward along the Gulf Coast, hoping to reach Pánuco. A storm drowned most of the expedition near Galveston Island, and about 80 were swept ashore. Narváez and a small group of men were carried out to sea on a raft and were not seen again. During the next 6 years all but four of the 80 who had been swept ashore perished. Only four men, three Spaniards and an enslaved man from Morocco, survived the Narváez expedition, walking across Texas and Northern Mexico. Some historians say their travels took them as far north as New Mexico. They encountered other Spaniards near Sinaloa, Mexico, in 1536, then travelled to Mexico City, arriving on July 25, 1536. One of the survivors, Álvar Núñez Cabeza de Vaca, returned to Spain, and in 1542 published the first book describing the people, animals, flora and fauna of inland North America in the Relación published in 1542 and again in 1555.

Birth and family
Pánfilo de Narváez was born in Castile (in either Cuéllar or Valladolid) in 1470 or 1478. He was a relative of Diego Velázquez de Cuéllar, the first Spanish governor of Cuba. His nephew was Antonio Velázquez de Narváez. Bartolomé de las Casas described him as "a man of authoritative personality, tall of body and somewhat blonde inclined to redness"

Jamaica and Cuba
Narváez took part in the Spanish conquest of Jamaica in 1509. In 1511 he went to Cuba to participate in the conquest of that island under the command of Diego Velázquez de Cuéllar. He led expeditions to the eastern end of the island in the company of Bartolomé de las Casas and Juan de Grijalva. As reported by de las Casas, who was an eyewitness, Narváez presided over the infamous massacre of Caonao, where Spanish troops put the sword to a village full of Indians who had come to meet them with offerings of food. Following the massacre, Narváez asked de las Casas, "What do you think about what our Spaniards have done?" to which de las Casas replied, "I send both you and them to the Devil!"

Mexico
In 1519, Diego Velázquez de Cuéllar, the governor of Cuba  authorized and paid for Hernán Cortés to man an expedition to Mexico. But having second thoughts about Cortés' loyalty, he recalled the expedition shortly after embarking. Cortés disobeyed and proceeded with the planned expedition that would eventually result in the overthrow of the Aztec Empire. Arriving from Cuba, Narváez was named governor of Mexico by Velázquez who sent him and 1,400 men on 19 ships to México to intercept Cortés.

Narváez disembarked at Veracruz, where Cortés had left behind a small garrison as he set out with the rest of his men for the Aztec capital of Tenochtitlan. The garrison was manned by Cortés' captain Gonzalo de Sandoval who managed to capture some of Narváez's men and send them to Tenochtitlan to alert Cortés of the coming danger. Unable to defeat the garrison Narváez went to the Totonac town of Cempoala, where he set up camp.

When the news of Narváez's arrival reached Cortés, the latter gathered a contingent of his troops, perhaps as few as 250 men, and returned to the coast. On May 27, 1520, Cortés men moved in on Narváez's camp at Cempoala under the cover of a driving rain, and quickly took control of the artillery and horses before entering the city. Narváez took a stand at the main temple of the city of Cempoala with a contingent of musketeers and crossbowmen. Finally Gonzalo de Sandoval arrived with reinforcements to Cortés who managed to set the main temple on fire, driving out Narváez and his men. Narváez was severely wounded, losing his right eye to a pike thrust. He was taken prisoner and spent two years as a prisoner at the garrison of Veracruz before he was sent back to Spain. His men, who had been promised gold by Cortés, joined the conquistadors and returned to Tenochtitlan where they participated in the conquest of the Aztec Empire.

In the meantime, the deadly disease of smallpox spread from a carrier in Narváez's party to the native population of New Spain, killing many.

Florida

Narváez was subsequently appointed adelantado of Florida by Charles V. He sailed from Sanlúcar de Barrameda on June 17, 1527, with a fleet of five ships and 600 men. After reaching Cuba and losing several ships in a hurricane, Narváez regrouped and set sail with five ships, 400 men, and 10 women, for the Rio de las Palmas in February 1528. His fleet ran aground and subsequently decided to go to Havana to obtain additional supplies. He was unable to reach Havana, as storms and strong winds forced him northward to the west coast of Florida.  The expedition arrived on the west coast of Florida in April 1528, weakened by storms and desertions. He landed with 300 men at the mouth of Boca Ciega Bay, near Tampa Bay, at what is currently known as the Jungle Prada Site in St. Petersburg—among hostile natives.

Soon after landing, Narváez led an excursion inland where he discovered the southern shore of today's Old Tampa Bay. He continued along its coastline and arrived at the main village of the Tocobaga Indians (today's Safety Harbor), where he discovered "many boxes from Castile" and numerous European artifacts. Recent research suggests that he may have found the remnants of the 1521 settlement that had been established and then abandoned by Juan Ponce de León. Upon determining that his anchorage was unsafe for his ships and that no source of food was available, he decided to separate the land party from the ships, ordering the ships and the land party to head north along the coast, planning to re-unite at a large bay that his pilots assured him was nearby. The land expedition consisted of 300 men and 42 horses led by Narváez. There was no large harbor north of their landing site, and Narváez never saw his ships again. His expedition moved northward in Florida until it reached the St. Marks River in the territory of the powerful Apalachee Indians. Unable to find the gold and other riches he sought and tired of the hostilities with the Indians, Narváez ordered the construction of four rafts to attempt to reach his original destination...Panuco.  He manned one raft for himself with the strongest men, the other led by Álvar Núñez Cabeza de Vaca the second in command. The estimated 240 survivors sailed the coastline west until a storm struck, drowning most, and washing an estimated 80 survivors ashore near Galveston Island, Texas.  Survivors of the storm were killed or captured by the natives. Only four of the 86 storm survivors escaped their captivity, the others having been either killed or starved to death.  Only four men survived the trek: Álvar Núñez Cabeza de Vaca, Andrés Dorantes de Carranza, Alonso del Castillo Maldonado and the Moroccan slave Estevanico (Esteban), who had remained in captivity in or near Galveston Island for six years.

Cabeza de Vaca wrote a narration entitled the 'Relación, in which he described the journey made by these four survivors on foot across the present day southwestern United States and northern Mexico. This trek took eight years from their initial landing in Florida before they arrived in Culiacán (Sinaloa), where they found Melchor Diaz as mayor and captain of the province.

References

Further reading

Herrick, Dennis. Esteban: The African Slave Who Explored America. University of New Mexico Press: Albuquerque. 2018. 
Maura, Juan Francisco (2008) (in Spanish). "El Gran Burlador de Ámerica: Alvar Núñez Cabeza de Vaca". Parnaseo-Lemir. Valencia:Universidad de Valencia. .
"Pánfilo de Narváez". Encyclopedia of World Biography. Vol. 11. 2nd ed. Detroit: Gale, 2004. p. 315.
Reséndez, Andrés (2007). A Land So Strange: The Epic Journey of Cabeza de Vaca. Basic Books, Perseus.  
Schneider, Paul (2006). Brutal Journey: The Epic Story of the First Crossing of North America. Henry Holt. 

External links
 "Cabeza de Vaca's Trail with Pánfilo de Narváez in North America"
  "Alvar Nuñez Cabeza de Vaca". The West''. PBS.
 Biography of Pánfilo de Narváez. About.com.
 Historia de las Indias. Bartolome de las Casas.
 Shipwrecked by "Alvar Nuñez Cabeza de Vaca, and the Description of the Journey Which he Made Through Florida with Panfilo de Narvaez," from the World Digital Library

Spanish explorers of North America
16th-century South American people
16th-century Spanish people
1470s births
1528 deaths
Year of birth uncertain
People of Spanish Florida
Spanish colonial period of Cuba
Spanish conquistadors
Castilian conquistadors
Explorers of Mexico
Explorers of the United States
Explorers of Spanish Florida